Dinis Lourenço Casals Namura Borges Pinto (born 24 August 2000) is a Portuguese professional footballer who plays as a right-back for the Portuguese club Braga.

Professional career
Pinto is a youth product of Hernâni Gonçalves, Paços de Ferreira, and Penafiel. He began his senior career with Lusitânia, before signing with Braga on 20 July 2021. He made his professional debut for Braga as a late sub in a 6–0 Primeira Liga win over Arouca on 30 December 2021.

References

External links
 

2000 births
Footballers from Porto
Living people
Portuguese footballers
S.C. Braga players
Primeira Liga players
Campeonato de Portugal (league) players
Association football fullbacks